John Mason (26 September 1880 – 9 July 1975) was a New Zealand politician and lawyer. He was a Reform Party Member of Parliament in Hawke's Bay in the 1920s.

Biography
Born in Hastings in 1880, Mason was a lawyer and was for a time in partnership with Matthew Oram.

During World War I, Mason enlisted in the New Zealand Expeditionary Force in January 1916, and served overseas with the New Zealand Medical Corps, rising to the rank of temporary warrant officer class 1. He returned to New Zealand and was discharged in 1919.

Of the four candidates, he came second to Labour's Lew McIlvride.
 
He won the Napier electorate from McIlvride in the 1925 general election, but was defeated by Labour's Bill Barnard in 1928.

In 1935, he was awarded the King George V Silver Jubilee Medal. Mason turned to local politics and served as a Napier City Councillor from 1941 to 1947.

Mason died in Napier in 1975 and was buried in Wharerangi Cemetery, Napier.

References

1880 births
1975 deaths
People from Hastings, New Zealand
Reform Party (New Zealand) MPs
New Zealand MPs for North Island electorates
Members of the New Zealand House of Representatives
Unsuccessful candidates in the 1928 New Zealand general election
Unsuccessful candidates in the 1922 New Zealand general election
New Zealand military personnel of World War I
Burials at Wharerangi Cemetery
Napier City Councillors